St Teath and Tintagel is an electoral ward in Cornwall in England for the Cornwall Council. It was created for the 2021 Cornwall Council election combining parts of the former Tintagel district and all of St Teath and St Breward.

Councillors

Election results

2021

References

Electoral divisions of Cornwall Council